The Confederate Monument in Paducah, located northwest of downtown Paducah, Kentucky is a historic monument located in Paducah's Oak Grove Cemetery.

It was built in 1907 on behalf of the United Daughters of the Confederacy.  It is a  granite obelisk.  Six Confederate war dead are buried by the monument.

On July 17, 1997, it was one of sixty-one different monuments to the Civil War in Kentucky placed on the National Register of Historic Places, as part of the Civil War Monuments of Kentucky Multiple Property Submission.  One other monument on the list, the Lloyd Tilghman Memorial, is nearby.

References

1907 sculptures
Buildings and structures in Paducah, Kentucky
Civil War Monuments of Kentucky MPS
National Register of Historic Places in McCracken County, Kentucky
Obelisks in the United States
United Daughters of the Confederacy monuments and memorials in Kentucky
1907 establishments in Kentucky